Phulrani Avismarniya Prem Kahani is a 2023 Indian Marathi-language romantic film co-written and directed Vishwas Joshi and produced by Fincraft Media, Amruta Films and Third Ace Entertainment. Distributed by Viacom18 Studios. Subodh Bhave and Priyadarshini Indalkar in lead roles. The film is a remake of the 1964 American musical comedy drama My Fair Lady, which is itself a adaptation of the 1913 play Pygmalion. It is theatrically released on 22 March 2023.

Cast 

 Subodh Bhave as Vikram Rajadhyaksha
 Priyadarshini Indalkar as Phulrani
 Milind Shinde as Hanmya/Phulrani's Father
 Ashwini Kulkarni as Megha
 Gaurav Ghatnekar as Dhruv
 Gaurav Malankar as Pintya
 Vikram Gokhale as Brigadier
 Shushant Shelar as Saurabh
 Dipali Jadhav as Sumi
 Vaishnavi Andhale as Riya
 Sayali Sanjeev in guest appearance

Release 
The film is theatrically released on 22 March 2023 on the occasion of Gudi Padwa.

Soundtrack

Refrences

External links 

 

2023 films
Remakes of American films
Indian romance films
Indian romantic drama films